The following lists events that happened during 2007 in Rwanda.

Incumbents 
 President: Paul Kagame 
 Prime Minister: Bernard Makuza

Events

June
 June 18 - Rwanda and Burundi join the East African Community in a meeting in Kampala, Uganda.

July
 July 21 - Two Rwandan men wanted for their role in the 1994 genocide are arrested in France.
 July 27 - Rwanda abolishes capital punishment.

August
 August 15 - Charles Murigande, the foreign minister of Rwanda, criticizes the Democratic Republic of Congo for stopping military operations against the Democratic Forces for the Liberation of Rwanda.

November
 November 16 - The International Criminal Tribunal for Rwanda sentences Juvénal Rugambarara, the former mayor of Bicumbi, to 11 years in jail for crimes he committed during the Rwandan Genocide.

References

 
2000s in Rwanda
Years of the 21st century in Rwanda
Rwanda
Rwanda